The City of Ipswich is a local government area in Queensland, Australia, located within the southwest of the Brisbane metropolitan area, including the urban area surrounding the city of Ipswich and surrounding rural areas.

Geography 
The City of Ipswich is centrally located in the South East Queensland region of Australia. Ipswich governs the outer western portion of the Brisbane Metropolitan Area, Queensland, Australia. To the east is the City of Brisbane local government area, and to the west are the rural and agricultural areas of the Brisbane, Lockyer and Fassifern Valleys.

History

Ipswich is the second-oldest local government area in Queensland, after Brisbane. On 16 November 1859, after the enactment of the Municipalities Act of 1858 in New South Wales, a petition containing 91 signatures was received by the Governor of New South Wales seeking to have Ipswich, which at the time had 3,000 people, granted municipal town status. The petition was gazetted the following day, and no counter-petition was received.

On 29 November, the letters patent authorised by Queen Victoria which were to make Queensland a separate colony were published in New South Wales, and the petition was forwarded to the new Queensland governor, Sir George Ferguson Bowen. On 10 December 1859, the same day that the letters patent were published in Queensland, the petition was regazetted. On 3 March 1860 the Borough of Ipswich was proclaimed, and its first elections were held on 19 April 1860, where John Murphy became its first Mayor. The Municipality's corporate logo was designed by Reverend Lacey H. Rumsey, the rector of St Paul's Church in Ipswich in 1861.

Ipswich applied on 22 November 1904 to become a City, the status being conferred by the Government of Queensland on 1 December 1904 and its first mayor was Hugh Reilly. On its declaration, the City of Ipswich covered only the central area of Ipswich itself – even what are today considered inner suburbs were parts of different entities.

Beginning in 1994 Ipswich adopted an innovative, community-based, information technology project which aimed to make the city a technology hub at the forefront of the growing move towards the information superhighway.  The most prominent feature of the initiative, which was called Global Info-Links, was the development of a new library with free public internet access and the development of a wide area network to which people could subscribe.

In October 2000, the council began erecting cast brass plaques at significant heritage sites.

The Greater Ipswich Scheme of 1916
On 13 October 1916, a rationalisation of the local government areas in and around Ipswich was implemented. It involved the abolition of five shires:
 Brassall
 Bundanba 
 Lowood
 Purga
 Walloon
resulting in:
 an enlarged City of Ipswich by including part of the Shire of Brassall and part of the Shire of Bundanba
 a new Shire of Ipswich by amalgamating part of the Shire of Brassall, part of the Shire of Bundanba, part of the Shire of Walloon and all of the Shire of Purga
 an enlarged Shire of Rosewood by including part of the Shire of Walloon
 an enlarged Shire of Esk by including all of the Shire of Lowood

Greater Ipswich Scheme of 1949
On 29 January 1949, a new Local Government Act was enacted to further amalgamate local government in the Ipswich area, abolishing the Shire of Normanby and the Shire of Rosewood. The City of Ipswich was enlarged (from 12¼ square miles to 30 square miles) to include the more urban parts of the Shire of Moreton (formerly known as the Shire of Ipswich). The Shire of Moreton was then enlarged by the  inclusion of the northern part of the Shire of Normanby and all the Shire of Rosewood. The southern part of the Shire of Normanby was transferred to an enlarged Shire of Boonah.

Further enlargement
The Shire of Moreton was amalgamated into the City of Ipswich on 11 March 1995.

Loss of rural areas
In March 2000, Ipswich ceded some rural territory in Mount Walker, Mutdapilly, Rosevale and Warrill View to the neighbouring Shire of Boonah. Following the major reforms of local government in Queensland, on 15 March 2008, Ipswich lost the largely rural areas of Harrisville and Peak Crossing in its southeast to the new Scenic Rim Region.

On 31 October 2012, a groundbreaking ceremony for the Ecco Ripley housing development project was conducted by then Ipswich mayor Paul Pisasale and Sekisui House.

Divisions 
The local government has 10 Councillors each representing one division (or ward). Each Councillor serves a four-year term. The Mayor is directly elected by the people every 4 years. Elected mayor of 2016, Paul Pisasale, resigned on 6 June 2017 citing health concerns (specifically multiple sclerosis).

Division 7 Councillor Andrew Antoniolli and Deputy Mayor Paul Tully both contested the 2017 Ipswich Mayoral By-Election, held on 19 August 2017. Councillor Antoniolli was elected Mayor with 34.57% of the primary vote and 54.44% after preferences, with Paul Tully winning 30.83% of the primary vote and 45.56% after preferences.

After Andrew Antoniolli's election as Mayor, a By-Election for the vacant Division 7 was held on 7 October 2017. David Martin was elected with 23.65% of the vote.
Antoniolli won the 2017 Ipswich City Council Mayoral By-Election, triggered by the resignation of former mayor, Paul Pisasale who was charged with multiple counts of corruption. In May 2018 Andrew Antoniolli was charged with seven counts of corruption forcing him to stand down and administrators to take over Ipswich City Council.

In August 2018, the Queensland Government passed legislation to dismiss all of the councillors and replace them with an administrator.

At the time of the dismissal, the divisional Councillors were:

Following by a reviewer by the administrator Greg Chemello, a new system of having four divisions each with  two councillors was introduced and was used in the local government elections on 28 March 2020.

The current councillors elected during the 2020 Local Government elections are:

Mayors

Suburbs
The City of Ipswich includes the following settlements:

Urban:
 Augustine Heights
 Barellan Point
 Basin Pocket
 Bellbird Park
 Blacksoil
 Blackstone
 Booval
 Brassall
 Brookwater
 Bundamba
 Carole Park
 Camira
 Churchill
 Chuwar
 Coalfalls
 Collingwood Park
 Dinmore
 East Ipswich
 Eastern Heights
 Ebenezer
 Ebbw Vale
 Flinders View
 Gailes
 Goodna
 Haigslea
 Ipswich
 Karalee

 Karrabin
 Leichhardt
 Moores Pocket
 Muirlea
 New Chum
 Newtown
 North Booval
 North Ipswich
 North Tivoli
 One Mile
 Raceview
 Redbank
 Redbank Plains
 Ripley
 Riverview
 Rosewood
 Sadliers Crossing
 Silkstone
 Springfield
 Springfield Central
 Springfield Lakes
 Swanbank
 Tivoli
 West Ipswich
 Woodend
 Wulkuraka
 Yamanto

Rural:
 Amberley
 Ashwell
 Calvert
 Deebing Heights
 Ebenezer
 Goolman
 Grandchester
 Haigslea
 Ironbark
 Jeebropilly
 Lanefield
 Limestone Ridges1
 Marburg
 Mount Forbes1

 Mount Marrow
 Mutdapilly1
 Peak Crossing1
 Pine Mountain
 Purga
 Rosewood
 South Ripley
 Spring Mountain
 Tallegalla
 Thagoona
 The Bluff
 Walloon
 White Rock2
 Willowbank
 Woolshed

1 - split with Scenic Rim Region2 - not to be confused with White Rock in Cairns Region

Services 
Ipswich City Council operates four public libraries at Ipswich Central, Redbank, Redbank Plains and Springfield Central. It also operates a mobile library service to Booval, Brassall, Camira, Flinders View (Winston Glades) Goodna, Grandchester, Karalee, Marburg, Rosewood, South Ripley, Walloon, and Willowbank.

Sister cities
  Nerima City, Japan (from 1994)
  Hyderabad, India (from 2010)

References

External links
 Ipswich City Council – Official site

 
Local government areas in Brisbane
Local government areas of Queensland
1860 establishments in Australia